Hugh Glennie Bignell (4 October 1882 – 6 May 1907) was an Indian born English Army officer and first-class cricketer. Bignell was a right-handed batsman who bowled right-arm fast.

Cricket
Bignell made his first-class debut for Hampshire in 1901 County Championship against Somerset, where he made his highest first-class score of 49*. Bignell played four matches for Hampshire in 1901, with his last game coming against Yorkshire.

In 1901/1902 Bignell played for the Europeans in India against the Parsees cricket team, which was made up of members of Bombays Zoroastrian community, at the Deccan Gymkhana Ground in Pune. Bignell returned to England and represented Hampshire in a single first-class match against Kent.

Military career
Bignell was educated at the Royal Military College, Sandhurst. After passing out on 27 August 1902, his name was added to the Unattached List of the Indian Army, and he was in October posted to the Punjab command.

He died in Rawalpindi, Punjab on 6 May 1907 from Typhoid fever.

Family
Bignell's brother Guy Bignell represented Hampshire in a 55 first-class matches between 1904 and 1925, as well as representing the Europeans in 1923/24.

References

External links
Hugh Bignell at Cricinfo
Hugh Bignell at CricketArchive

1882 births
1907 deaths
English cricketers
Hampshire cricketers
Europeans cricketers
Deaths from typhoid fever
Graduates of the Royal Military College, Sandhurst
British Indian Army officers
British people in colonial India